Alfani can refer to
 Domenico Alfani, 16th century Italian painter
 Orazio Alfani, Domenico's son, also a painter